Qaleh-ye Sartoli (also Romanized as Qal‘eh-ye Sartolī; also known as Sartolī) is a village in Hamaijan Rural District, Hamaijan District, Sepidan County, Fars Province, Iran. At the 2006 census, its population was 631, in 153 families.

References 

Populated places in Sepidan County